The Order of Australia is the only Australian order of chivalry. It was established on 14 February 1975 by Elizabeth II, Queen of Australia, to recognise Australian citizens and other persons for achievement, meritorious service, or for both. At that time, Companion of the Order of Australia was the highest of three grades of the Order (Companion, Officer, Member).

On 24 May 1976, the grade of Knight or Dame of the Order was established, displacing Companion as the highest grade.  On 3 June 1986, the Knight/Dame grade was abolished, and Companion was once again the highest grade.

On 25 March 2014, the Knight/Dame grade was re-established, Companion once again being relegated to the second highest grade of the Order.  The Knight/Dame grade was again abolished on 2 November 2015.

Divisions 
The Order has two divisions; General and Military.  In general, recipients who are not Australian citizens are appointed Honorary Companions, though there have been certain exceptions. (For example, Prince Philip's appointment as AC (mil.) was substantive.)

Knights and Dames
Seven Companions have later been promoted to Knight or Dame of the Order of Australia: Sir John Kerr, Sir Gordon Jackson, Dame Quentin Bryce, Sir Peter Cosgrove, Dame Marie Bashir, Sir Angus Houston and Prince Philip, Duke of Edinburgh.

Australian Companions

General Division

Military Division

Honorary Companions

Former Companions

Announcements of appointments of Companions 
A list of links to announcements of all awards appears on the Governor-General's website.

Gen = General Division; Mil = Military Division; Hon = Honorary award; Tot = Total

Australian Honours Search Facility (previously called It's an Honour)
 Companion of the Order of Australia 
 Fact sheet 
 From the Advanced search  page, it is possible to produce a list of all recipients that appear in the Australian Honours Search Facility database).
In March 2014, there were 457 entries in the database.
In December 2016 there were 501 entries in the database. (Versus [508 awarded minus 3 resigned minus 1 cancelled] = 504, minus 3 not in the database = 501)
In September 2017 there were 512 entries in the database. (519-4=515, minus 3 = 512)
The list does not necessarily show all recipients of the Companion of the Order of Australia, as some awardees of Australian honours elect not to have their names appear on the Australian Honours Search Facility website.
The database information does not distinguish between the General and Military divisions, nor whether the award is honorary or substantive.
Note, however, that honorary recipients are denoted by [ H ] next to their name in the search function.
 As stated above, awards to foreigners are usually honorary, and to date, all awards to foreign Companions in the General division have been honorary. The only exception to this has been Prince Philip's appointment as AC (mil). To date there have been no Honorary Companion appointments to the Military division. This has not necessarily been the case in other grades. (For example, US General David Petraeus AO (mil) is honorary, and Prince Charles and Prince Philip's substantive knighthoods (AK) were enabled by changes to the Letters Patent.)

See also
 List of Knights and Dames of the Order of Australia

Notes and citations